Honey Benjamin is the former mayor of Kollam city. She is a CPI party member and politician from Kollam city, India. She is the first CPI mayor of Kollam City Corporation. Benjamin won the election by one vote, with a total of 28 votes against her opponent's 27.

Works and Contributions 
As mayor, Benjamin focused on issues such as waste management and the provision of electricity. In January 2020, Benjamin announced a campaign to use drone-mapping to gather information about resource management in the city of Kollam.

To promote shooting sports in  Kollam  district an indoor shooting range was opened  in the city, Mayor Honey Benjamin  lighted  the traditional lamp. Honey Benjamin presided over the inauguration of Kollam women’s police station which has become the second district in the State to have a women’s police station whereas Kannur holds the first place.

References

External links

Kerala municipal councillors
Mayors of places in Kerala
Living people
Communist Party of India politicians from Kerala
Women mayors of places in Kerala
Politicians from Kollam
20th-century Indian women politicians
20th-century Indian politicians
21st-century Indian women politicians
21st-century Indian politicians
Year of birth missing (living people)